Paperhouse is a 1988 British dark fantasy film directed by Bernard Rose. It was based on the 1958 novel Marianne Dreams by Catherine Storr. The film stars Ben Cross, Glenne Headly and Gemma Jones. The original novel was the basis of a six-episode British TV series for children in the early 1970s which was titled Escape Into Night.

Plot
While suffering from glandular fever, 11-year-old Anna Madden draws a house. When she falls asleep, she has disturbing dreams in which she finds herself inside the house she has drawn. After she draws a face at the window, in her next dream she finds Marc, a boy who suffers with muscular dystrophy, living in the house. She learns from her doctor that Marc is a real person.

Anna sketches her father into the drawing so that he can help carry Marc away, but she inadvertently gives him an angry expression which she then crosses out, and the father (who has been away a lot and has a drinking problem, putting a strain on his marriage) appears in the dream as a furious, blinded ogre. Anna and Marc defeat the monster and shortly afterward Anna recovers, although the doctor reveals that Marc's condition is deteriorating.

Anna's father returns home and both parents seem determined to get over their marital difficulties. The family goes on holiday by the sea, where Anna finds an epilogue to her dream.

Cast
 Charlotte Burke - Anna Madden
 Ben Cross - Dad 
 Glenne Headly - Kate Madden
 Elliott Spiers - Marc 
 Gemma Jones - Dr. Sarah Nichols 
 Jane Bertish - Miss Vanstone 
 Samantha Cahill - Sharon
 Sarah Newbold - Karen

Reception
Film critic Roger Ebert gave Paperhouse four stars out of four and called it "a film in which every image has been distilled to the point of almost frightening simplicity" and ended by saying "this is not a movie to be measured and weighed and plumbed, but to be surrendered to."

On the television show Siskel & Ebert, Paperhouse received a "Thumbs Up" from Roger Ebert who commented "I suppose Paperhouse will be classified as a fantasy thriller, but I thought it was a lot more than that. A dream movie that uses images so real and so concrete, they seem more convincing than most real-life dramas." He also commented how effective the soundtrack was. He said that Paperhouse showed that director Bernard Rose was extremely talented. Gene Siskel gave the film a marginal "Thumbs Down", but he agreed that Bernard Rose was very talented and said, "for about two-thirds of the way I was fascinated by this film." He also commented on how well the dream scenes were handled and said, "these seem to be legitimate fears that child might have." He stated that "when the film got more explicit... I thought the film went over-the-top with imagery and I got a little tired of it. Until then, I was fascinated by it."

The critics who have submitted their reviews to Rotten Tomatoes have given Paperhouse a "fresh" rating of 100%, but the users give it a "fresh" rating of 71%.

Home media
Paperhouse was initially released on VHS format not long following its theatrical exhibition in the United Kingdom.

In the United States, Vestron Video handled releasing it on both VHS and Laserdisc, both in the 1:33.1 aspect ratio.

The film was made available on DVD on 24 September 2001 via Columbia TriStar Home Entertainment in its original widescreen aspect ratio of 1.66:1. Lionsgate Home Entertainment released a re-issue of the film to DVD on 24 September 2007.

In France, the film received its first Blu-ray release from Metropolitan distribution on 2 May 2013 in a Special Edition containing the original English audio and a dubbed French audio, both in DTS-HD Master Audio 2.0, and optional French subtitles. It features an aspect ratio of 1.78:1. This set is now out-of-print.

The movie hasn't been given a DVD release in the United States, nor has it been released on Blu-ray in any country outside of France.

Tie-in book edition
The film's book basis, Marianne Dreams by Catherine Storr, was given a hardcover film tie-in release in 1989, featuring a film still of Charlotte Burke reaching towards a stormy sky with the imaginary house in the background, along with a bottom-corner caption reading, "new major feature film Paperhouse". The release was unusual, as most children's film tie-in books at the time were released as mass-market paperbacks, while publisher Lutterworth Press had opted for a bound hardcover instead. This edition of Storr's book has since fallen out of print.

References

External links
 
 
 

Paperhouse
1988 fantasy films
British fantasy films
Films with screenplays by Matthew Jacobs
Films based on British novels
Films based on fantasy novels
Working Title Films films
Films shot at Pinewood Studios
Films directed by Bernard Rose (director)
Films scored by Stanley Myers
Films scored by Hans Zimmer
Films produced by Tim Bevan
Films about nightmares
1980s English-language films
Films about children
1980s British films